was a member of the Imperial House of Japan and the eldest son of Takahito, Prince Mikasa and Yuriko, Princess Mikasa. He was a first cousin of Emperor Akihito, and was formerly sixth in the line of succession to the Japanese throne and the heir apparent to the princely house of Mikasa-no-miya and the title "Prince Mikasa". Prince Tomohito was the first member of the Imperial House of Japan with a full beard since Emperor Meiji, thus earning him the popular nickname of the "Bearded Prince" (ヒゲの殿下 Hige no Denka). He died of cancer on 6 June 2012, aged 66.

Early life and education

Prince Tomohito was born on 5 January 1946 at Prince Mikasa's family home. He graduated from the Department of Political Studies in the Faculty of Law of Gakushuin University in 1968. From 1968 – 1970, he studied at Magdalen College, University of Oxford, in the United Kingdom.

Marriage and family 
The Prince became engaged to Miss Nobuko Asō on 21 May 1980. She is the third daughter of the late Takakichi Asō, chairman of Asō Cement Co., and his wife, Kazuko, the daughter of former Prime Minister, Shigeru Yoshida. She is also the sister of former Prime Minister and Deputy Prime Minister Tarō Asō. The couple married on 7 November 1980. Miss Asō was given the title HIH Princess Tomohito of Mikasa. The Prince and Princess had two daughters:

 
 

The family lived in a compound within the Akasaka Estate complex, in Moto-Akasaka, Minato, Tokyo. In October 2009, his wife separated her residence from him and their children.

Public service 

For the 1972 Sapporo Winter Olympics, Prince Tomohito served as a committee member on the organizing committee from 1970 until 1972. He was also on the committee for the 1975 Okinawa World Fair.

Prince Tomohito was president and honorary president of various organizations that concerned themselves with cancer research (the Princess Takamatsu Cancer Research Fund), having himself suffered from the disease from 2003, youth education and promotion of international relations. He was also noted for his support of organizations which promoted the welfare of people with physical or mental disabilities through sporting activities, such as skiing, bowling, dancing and rugby. He traveled extensively abroad with the princess on charity, and support missions that concerned matters of illness and welfare. The Prince often gave lectures and contributed articles to national newspapers and magazines, and had also authored seven books.
In December 1992, the Prince and Princess visited the United States to support a newly established cancer ward in the New York Medical College, and in 1994, visited Hawaii to support the reconstruction of Kuakini Hospital. In February 1994, the Prince and Princess visited Norway to attend the 1994 Winter Olympics in Lillehammer, Norway.

In April 1998, the Prince and Princess visited Turkey to attend the opening ceremony of the Turkey-Japan Foundation Cultural Centre. They had previously visited Turkey in 1990 as part of the celebrations for the 100th anniversary of Japan-Turkey relations. The Prince strongly supported the establishment of a Japanese Institute of Anatolian Archaeology at the Middle Eastern Culture Center in Japan, and returned to Turkey again in October 2002, June 2003 and October 2003 leading three groups of benefactors on tours of the heritage of Turkey.
In June 1998, Prince Tomohito visited Australia for fundraising activities for a medical science foundation to commemorate the Australian Nobel Prize winner Dr. Howard Walter Florey. In December of the same year, he visited Thailand to attend the 13th Asian Games.

In April 2003, Prince Tomohito visited Norway accompanied by his daughter, Princess Akiko to attend the World Cross Country Ski Championships for the Visually Disabled.

He appeared on the radio as a DJ in his younger days.

Health problems and death 
The Prince was first diagnosed with cancer in 1991, but later went into remission. He was diagnosed with cancer of the larynx in 2003, and immediately began treatment for it. In September 2006, he fractured his jaw, which had been weakened by his chemotherapy treatments. In 2007, the Prince made a public announcement that he was suffering from alcoholism, and was undergoing treatments at the Imperial Household Agency hospital. In March 2008, his cancer spread to his pharynx, and he underwent surgery. Although attempts were made to save his voice, he subsequently suffered from pneumonia caused by his inability to properly swallow food, and was thereafter only able to speak with the aid of a mechanical larynx.

On 6 June 2012, the Prince died from multiple organ failure at the Sasaki Institute Kyoundo Hospital in Tokyo, aged 66. He had been hospitalized for some time, as a result of his multiple cancer diagnoses. Around 660 people attended his funeral, which was held at the Toshimagaoka Imperial Cemetery.

In June 2013, the Imperial Household Agency stated that they had integrated his family into the household led by his father.

Views on the imperial succession
Amid the Japanese imperial succession debate, then-Prime Minister Junichirō Koizumi strongly supported the revision of the Imperial Household Law to allow a woman to ascend to the Imperial Throne, pledging to present a bill to the 2006 session of the parliament. Some conservative lawmakers opposed Koizumi and said the debate was premature. Prince Tomohito also opposed the proposal, saying that the official male members of the Japanese imperial family might take up concubines in order to produce male members because it was previously possible for a male illegitimate child to assume the imperial throne. Later he said that this remark was just a joke.

Titles and styles 

 5 January 1946 – 6 June 2012: His Imperial Highness Prince Tomohito of Mikasa

Honours

National honours 
 Grand Cordon of the Order of the Chrysanthemum (05/06/1966)

Foreign honours 
  : Knight Grand Cross of the Order of Merit of the Italian Republic (09/03/1982)

Honorary degree 
 Ankara University

Honorary positions 
 President of the Social Welfare Organization Yuai Jyuji Kai
 President of the Arinomama-sha
 President of the Social Welfare Organization Saiseikai Imperial Gift Foundation Inc.
 President of the New Technology Development Foundation
 President of the Princess Takamatsu Cancer Research Fund
 President of the Nippon Billiard Association
 President of the Professional Ski Instructors Association of Japan
 President of the Collegiate Skating And Ice Hockey Federation
 President of the Japan-Turkey Society
 President of the Middle Eastern Culture Center in Japan
 Honorary President of the Japan Rugby Football Union
 Honorary President of the Japan-British Society
 Honorary President of the Norway-Japan Society

Ancestry

Patrilineal descent

Imperial House of Japan

 Descent prior to Keitai is unclear to modern historians, but traditionally traced back patrilineally to Emperor Jimmu
 Emperor Keitai, ca. 450–534
 Emperor Kinmei, 509–571
 Emperor Bidatsu, 538–585
 Prince Oshisaka, ca. 556–???
 Emperor Jomei, 593–641
 Emperor Tenji, 626–671
 Prince Shiki, ???–716
 Emperor Kōnin, 709–786
 Emperor Kanmu, 737–806
 Emperor Saga, 786–842
 Emperor Ninmyō, 810–850
 Emperor Kōkō, 830–867
 Emperor Uda, 867–931
 Emperor Daigo, 885–930
 Emperor Murakami, 926–967
 Emperor En'yū, 959–991
 Emperor Ichijō, 980–1011
 Emperor Go-Suzaku, 1009–1045
 Emperor Go-Sanjō, 1034–1073
 Emperor Shirakawa, 1053–1129
 Emperor Horikawa, 1079–1107
 Emperor Toba, 1103–1156
 Emperor Go-Shirakawa, 1127–1192
 Emperor Takakura, 1161–1181
 Emperor Go-Toba, 1180–1239
 Emperor Tsuchimikado, 1196–1231
 Emperor Go-Saga, 1220–1272
 Emperor Go-Fukakusa, 1243–1304
 Emperor Fushimi, 1265–1317
 Emperor Go-Fushimi, 1288–1336
 Emperor Kōgon, 1313–1364
 Emperor Sukō, 1334–1398
 Prince Yoshihito Fushimi, 1351–1416
 Prince Sadafusa Fushimi, 1372–1456
 Emperor Go-Hanazono, 1419–1471
 Emperor Go-Tsuchimikado, 1442–1500
 Emperor Go-Kashiwabara, 1464–1526
 Emperor Go-Nara, 1495–1557
 Emperor Ōgimachi, 1517–1593
 Prince Masahito, 1552–1586
 Emperor Go-Yōzei, 1572–1617
 Emperor Go-Mizunoo, 1596–1680
 Emperor Reigen, 1654–1732
 Emperor Higashiyama, 1675–1710
 Prince Naohito Kanin, 1704–1753
 Prince Sukehito Kanin, 1733–1794
 Emperor Kōkaku, 1771–1840
 Emperor Ninkō, 1800–1846
 Emperor Kōmei, 1831–1867
 Emperor Meiji, 1852–1912
 Emperor Taishō, 1879–1926
 Takahito, Prince Mikasa
 Prince Tomohito of Mikasa

Notes

External links 

 Her Imperial Highness Princess Mikasa and her family at the Imperial Household Agency website

1946 births
2012 deaths
Alumni of Magdalen College, Oxford
Gakushuin University alumni
Japanese princes
Japanese radio personalities
People from Tokyo
Deaths from cancer in Japan
Heirs apparent who never acceded
Knights Grand Cross of the Order of Merit of the Italian Republic
Deaths from multiple organ failure